The vice president of Macedonia was a political position in the Republic of Macedonia in 1991 before a new constitution was adopted in November 1991. The Vice President was elected alongside the President of Macedonia by the Assembly of the Republic of Macedonia in January 1991.

References

Politics of North Macedonia
Government of North Macedonia
Macedonia
Titles held only by one person